Tomcats is a 1977 American film directed by Harry E. Kerwin and starring Chris Mulkey, Polly King, Wayne Crawford, and William Kerwin. It was also known as Deadbeat, Getting Even and Avenged.

Filmed and set in Miami, Florida, the film details the actions of four amoral and degenerate thugs, named M.J., Johnny, Billy, and Curly, who travel around robbing, gang-raping and murdering young women. When they are arrested but get away with their crimes on a legal technicality, the older brother of one of their victims, a law student named Cullen Garrett, decides to take the law into his own hands by stalking and killing the four thugs one by one.

Cast

Chris Mulkey as Cullen Garrett
Polly King as Tracy
Wayne Crawford as M.J. (credited as Scott Lawrence)
Daniel Schweitzer as Johnny
Sam Moree as Curly
Jim Curry as Billy
William Kerwin as Detective Tom Garrett (credited as Thomas Dowling)
Rich DeMott as Ben Garrett
Alison Schlicter as Wendy Garrett
Robert Shields as Police Chief Henderson

References

External links

1977 films
American thriller films
1970s crime thriller films
Dimension Pictures films
1970s English-language films
1970s American films